Šibenik-Knin County is a county in southern Croatia, located in the north-central part of Dalmatia. The biggest city in the county is Šibenik, which also serves as county seat. Other notable towns in the county are Knin, Vodice, Drniš and Skradin.

The county covers 2984 km2. It includes 242 islands and national parks, Krka and Kornati.

Administrative division

Šibenik-Knin county is administratively subdivided into:

 City of Šibenik (county seat)
 City of Knin
 Town of Drniš
 Town of Skradin
 Town of Vodice
 Municipality of Biskupija
 Municipality of Civljane
 Municipality of Ervenik
 Municipality of Kijevo
 Municipality of Kistanje
 Municipality of Murter-Kornati — Murter, the capital of the municipality
 Municipality of Pirovac
 Municipality of Primošten
 Municipality of Promina — Oklaj, the capital of the municipality
 Municipality of Rogoznica
 Municipality of Ružić — Gradac, the capital of the municipality
 Municipality of Tisno
 Municipality of Unešić
 Municipality of Bilice
 Municipality of Tribunj — founded in 2006, separated from Vodice

County government
, the Župan is Marko Jelić (Ind.), and the county assembly's 37 representatives are affiliated as follows:

Demographics

According to the 2011 census, Šibenik-Knin County has a population of 109,375. Croats make up a majority with 87.39% of the population. The Serbs are the second largest ethnic group (10,53%).

In 1991, before the war, Croats were in majority, with a Serb minority of 34.2%.

References

External links

 

Šibenik-Knin County
Counties of Croatia
Dalmatia